Valentin Maslakov (born 4 December 1944) is a Belarusian sprinter. He competed in the men's 200 metres at the 1968 Summer Olympics representing the Soviet Union.

References

External links
 

1944 births
Living people
Athletes (track and field) at the 1968 Summer Olympics
Belarusian male sprinters
Olympic athletes of the Soviet Union
Place of birth missing (living people)
Soviet male sprinters
Universiade medalists in athletics (track and field)
Universiade bronze medalists for the Soviet Union